e-rara.ch is a Swiss digital library dedicated to providing free online access to rare antique Swiss books and prints. It opened to the public in March 2010, and aims to make more than 10,000 works available by the end of 2011.

Project
The e-rara.ch project is part of the e-lib.ch initiative of the Swiss universities. It is hosted by the ETH Zurich's library and also includes works held by the university libraries of Basel and Bern, the Bibliothèque de Genève and the Zentralbibliothek Zürich.

The library's principal aim is to make the Swiss cultural heritage more widely available and to assist researchers, who would otherwise have to consult the rare works  in situ.

Collection
The library's initial focus is on prints of the 16th century. That century is considered the golden age of Swiss book printing on account of the many notable bibles, ceremonial prints, research treatises and writings related to the Reformation printed in Switzerland at that time, including works by Vesalius, Paracelsus, Zwingli and Calvin. Exceptional works from that era include the first full Latin translation of the Qur'an (1543). Works from other eras, notably incunables (pre-1501 prints) and 17th century prints, are scheduled to be digitized and added to the library at a later time.

The scanned works are made available in 300 dpi resolution as downloadable PDF files or as individual images through a web browser gallery.

External links
 e-rara.ch
 e-lib.ch

References

Swiss digital libraries
Early modern printing databases